KIE may refer to:
 Kinetic isotope effect
 KIE, IATA airport code of Kieta Aropa Airport in Papua New Guinea
 Kiè, a town in Burkina Faso